Provocative Percussion Volume 2 is a studio album by Enoch Light and The Light Brigade. It was released in 1960 on Command Records (catalog no. RS 810-SD). The album cover artwork is by abstract painter Josef Albers.

Provocative Percussion debuted on the Billboard magazine pop album chart on September 19, 1960, peaked at the No. 4 spot, and remained on the chart for 31 weeks.

AllMusic gave the album a rating of three stars. Reviewer Eugene Chadbourne called Light "a heavyweight when it comes to big-band charts."

Track listing 
Side A
 "Hernando's Hideaway" (J. Ross, R. Adler) [3:05]
 "Speak To Me Of Love - Cha Cha" (B. Sievier, J. Lenoir) [2:50]
 "Matilda" (N. Span) [2:41]
 "Good Night Sweetheart - Cha Cha" (J. Campbell, R. Noble, R. Connolly, R. Vallee) [2:41]
 "What Is This Thing Called Love" (Cole Porter) [2:42]
 "Lady Is A Tramp" (R. Rodgers, L. Hart) [3:24]

Side B
 "Speak Low" (K. Weill, O. Nash) [2:51]
 "I've Got The Right To Sing The Blues" (H. Arlen, T. Koehler) [2:54]
 "Mack The Knife" (K. Weill, M. Blitzstein) [3:20]
 "Temptation" (A. Freed, Nacio Herb Brown) [2:42]
 "The Natives Are Restless Tonight" (E. Light, L. Davies) [2:43]
 "Foggy Day Cha Cha" (Geore & Ira Gershwin) [2:56]

References

Enoch Light albums
1960 albums
Command Records albums
Albums with cover art by Josef Albers